Marta Burgay (30 November 1976, Torino) is an Italian radio astronomer whose initial claim to fame was being the discoverer of PSR J0737-3039, the first double pulsar (two pulsars orbiting each other), through using the 64-metre Parkes radio telescope in Australia.

Awards and honors 
 Her Thesis on radio pulsars won the 2005 Pietro Tacchini Prize, awarded by the Italian Astronomical Society for the best Ph.D. thesis.
 In 2006, she became the first winner of the IUPAP's Young Scientists Prize in Astrophysics award.
 In 2010, she was honoured with the Vainu Bappu Gold Medal by the Astronomical Society of India.
 Asteroid 198634 Burgaymarta, discovered at Vallemare di Borbona in 2005, was named in her honor. The official  was published by the Minor Planet Center on 5 October 2017.

References

External links 
 

Radio astronomers
21st-century Italian astronomers
Italian women scientists
Women astronomers
Living people
Year of birth missing (living people)